The Lancet is a weekly peer-reviewed general medical journal and one of the oldest of its kind. It is also the world's highest-impact academic journal. It was founded in England in 1823.

The journal publishes original research articles, review articles ("seminars" and "reviews"), editorials, book reviews, correspondence, as well as news features and case reports. The Lancet has been owned by Elsevier since 1991, and its editor-in-chief since 1995 has been Richard Horton. The journal has editorial offices in London, New York City, and Beijing.

History
The Lancet was founded in 1823 by Thomas Wakley, an English surgeon who named it after the surgical instrument called a lancet (scalpel). Members of the Wakley family retained editorship of the journal until 1908. In 1921, The Lancet was acquired by Hodder & Stoughton. Elsevier acquired The Lancet from Hodder & Stoughton in 1991.

Impact
According to the Journal Citation Reports, the journal has a 2021 impact factor of 202.731 ranking it first above The New England Journal of Medicine in the category "Medicine, General & Internal".

Specialty journals
The Lancet also publishes several specialty journals: The Lancet Neurology (neurology), The Lancet Oncology (oncology), The Lancet Infectious Diseases (infectious diseases), The Lancet Respiratory Medicine (respiratory medicine), The Lancet Psychiatry (psychiatry), The Lancet Diabetes and Endocrinology (endocrinology), and The Lancet Gastroenterology & Hepatology (gastroenterology) all of which publish original research and reviews. In 2013, The Lancet Global Health (global health) became the group's first fully open access journal. In 2014, The Lancet Haematology (haematology) and The Lancet HIV (infectious diseases) were launched, both as online only research titles. The Lancet Child & Adolescent Health (paediatrics) launched in 2017. The three established speciality journals (The Lancet Neurology, The Lancet Oncology, and The Lancet Infectious Diseases) have built up strong reputations in their medical speciality. According to the Journal Citation Reports, The Lancet Oncology has a 2021 impact factor of 54.433, The Lancet Neurology has 59.935, and The Lancet Infectious Diseases has 71.421. There is also an online website for students entitled The Lancet Student in blog format, launched in 2007.

Since July 2018, The Lancet has also published two open access journals as part of The Lancet Discovery Science, dedicated to essential early evidence: eBioMedicine (translational research), a journal initially launched in 2014 by parent publisher Elsevier, since 2015 supported by Cell Press and The Lancet, and eventually (July 2018) incorporated in The Lancet family journals together with its newly incepted sister journal eClinicalMedicine (clinical research and public health research).

Specialty journal commissions 
Occasionally, the editors of the specialty journals will feel it incumbent upon themselves to name commissions about a certain particular issue of concern to a wide sub-audience of their readers. One example of this type of commission is the Lancet Infectious Diseases Commission on "Preparedness for emerging epidemic threats", which reported on its mandate in January 2020.

Volume renumbering
Prior to 1990, The Lancet had volume numbering that reset every year. Issues in January to June were in volume i, with the rest in volume ii. In 1990, the journal moved to a sequential volume numbering scheme, with two volumes per year. Volumes were retro-actively assigned to the years prior to 1990, with the first issue of 1990 being assigned volume 335, and the last issue of 1989 assigned volume 334. The table of contents listing on ScienceDirect uses this new numbering scheme.

Political controversies
The Lancet has taken a political stand on several important medical and non-medical issues. Recent examples include criticism of the World Health Organization (WHO), rejection of a draft WHO report on the efficacy of homeopathy as a therapeutic option, disapproval during the time Reed Exhibitions (a division of Reed Elsevier) hosted arms industry fairs, a call in 2003 for tobacco to be made illegal in the United Kingdom, and a call for an independent investigation into the American bombing of a hospital in Afghanistan in 2015.

The Lancet was accused of sexism after using the phrase "bodies with vaginas" on the cover of the edition for 25 September 2021. Editor in Chief Richard Horton issued an apology on the journal's website.

Tobacco ban proposal (2003) 
A December 2003 editorial by the journal, titled "How do you sleep at night, Mr Blair?", called for tobacco use to be completely banned in the United Kingdom. The Royal College of Physicians rejected their argument. John Britton, chairman of the college's tobacco advisory group, praised the journal for discussing the health problem, but he concluded that a "ban on tobacco would be a nightmare." Amanda Sandford, spokesperson for the anti-tobacco group Action on Smoking and Health, stated that criminalising a behaviour 26% of the population commit "is ludicrous." She also said: "We can't turn the clock back. If tobacco were banned we would have 13 million people desperately craving a drug that they would not be able to get." The deputy editor of The Lancet responded to the criticism by arguing that no other measures besides a total ban would likely be able to reduce tobacco use.

The smokers rights group FOREST stated that the editorial gave them "amusement and disbelief". Director Simon Clark called the journal "fascist" and argued that it is hypocritical to ban tobacco while allowing unhealthy junk foods, alcohol consumption, and participation in extreme sports. Health Secretary John Reid reiterated that his government was committed to helping people give up smoking. He added: "Despite the fact that this is a serious problem, it is a little bit extreme for us in Britain to start locking people up because they have an ounce of tobacco somewhere."

Iraq War death toll estimates 

The Lancet also published an estimate of the Iraq War's Iraqi death toll—around 100,000—in 2004. In 2006, a follow-up study by the same team suggested that the violent death rate in Iraq was not only consistent with the earlier estimate, but had increased considerably in the intervening period (see Lancet surveys of casualties of the Iraq War). The second survey estimated that there had been 654,965 excess Iraqi deaths as a consequence of the war. The 95% confidence interval was 392,979 to 942,636. 1,849 households that contained 12,801 people were surveyed.

The estimates provided in the second article are much higher than those published in other surveys from the same time. Most notably, the "Iraq Family Health Survey" published in the New England Journal of Medicine surveyed 9,345 households across Iraq and estimated 151,000 deaths due to violence (95% uncertainty range, 104,000 to 223,000) over the same period covered in the second Lancet survey by Burnham et al. The NEJM article stated that the second Lancet survey "considerably overestimated the number of violent deaths" and said the Lancet results were "highly improbable, given the internal and external consistency of the data and the much larger sample size and quality-control measures taken in the implementation of the IFHS."

Open letter for the people of Gaza (2014)
In August 2014 and during the 2014 Israel–Gaza conflict, The Lancet published an "Open letter for the people of Gaza" in their correspondence section. The principal author of the letter was Dr. Paola Manduca, Professor of Genetics at the University of Genoa in Italy. As reported in The Daily Telegraph, the letter "condemned Israel in the strongest possible terms, but strikingly made no mention of Hamas' atrocities." According to Haaretz, the authors of the letter include doctors who "are apparently sympathetic to the views of David Duke, a white supremacist and former Ku Klux Klan Grand Wizard." One of the doctors responded by saying that the letter was a legitimate exercise in freedom of expression, while a second one stated that he had no knowledge about David Duke or the Ku Klux Klan.

The editor of The Lancet, Richard Horton, said: "I have no plans to retract the letter, and I would not retract the letter even if it was found to be substantiated." However, Horton subsequently came to Israel's Rambam Hospital for a visit and said that he "deeply, deeply regret[ted] the completely unnecessary polarization that publication of the letter by Dr Paola Manduca caused."

Mark Pepys, a member of the Jewish Medical Association, criticised the letter as being a "partisan political diatribe" which was inappropriate for a serious publication. In addition, Pepys accused Richard Horton personally for allowing the publication of such political views.

February 2020 letter dismissing lab-leak theory 

On 19 February 2020, The Lancet published a letter signed by 27 scientists that stated: "We stand together to strongly condemn conspiracy theories suggesting that COVID-19 does not have a natural origin... and overwhelmingly conclude that this coronavirus originated in wildlife," adding: "Conspiracy theories do nothing but create fear, rumours, and prejudice that jeopardise our global collaboration in the fight against this virus." The letter has been criticized for having a chilling effect on scientific research and the scientific community by implying that scientists who "bring up the lab-leak theory... are doing the work of conspiracy theorists"; the statement was deemed to have "effectively ended the debate over COVID-19's origins before it began". Further criticism of the letter was focused on the fact that, according to emails obtained through FOIA, members involved in producing the letter concealed their involvement "to creat[e] the impression of scientific unanimity" and failed to disclose conflicts of interest.

After having published letters supporting only the natural origins theory, The Lancet published a letter in September 2021 from a group of 16 virologists, biologists and biosecurity specialists saying that "Research-related hypotheses are not misinformation or conjecture" and that "Scientific journals should open their columns to in-depth analyses of all hypotheses." The Times of India described The Lancet's decision to publish the letter as a "u-turn".

Retracted papers and scientific controversies

Andrew Wakefield and the MMR vaccine (1998) 

The Lancet was criticised after it published a paper in 1998 in which the authors suggested a link between the MMR vaccine and autism spectrum disorder. In February 2004, The Lancet published a statement by 10 of the paper's 13 coauthors repudiating the possibility that MMR could cause autism. The editor-in-chief, Richard Horton, went on the record to say the paper had "fatal conflicts of interest" because the study's lead author, Andrew Wakefield, had a serious conflict of interest that he had not declared to The Lancet. The journal completely retracted the paper on 2 February 2010, after Wakefield was found to have acted unethically in conducting the research.

The Lancets six editors, including the editor-in-chief, were also criticised in 2011 because they had "covered up" the "Wakefield concocted fear of MMR" with an "avalanche of denials" in 2004.

PACE study (2011) 
In 2011, The Lancet published a study by the UK-based "PACE trial management group", which reported success with graded exercise therapy and cognitive behavioural therapy for chronic fatigue syndrome; a follow-up study was published in Lancet Psychiatry in 2015. The studies attracted criticism from some patients and researchers, especially with regard to data analysis that was different from that described in the original protocol. In a 2015 Slate article, biostatistician Bruce Levin of Columbia University was quoted saying "The Lancet needs to stop circling the wagons and be open", and that "one of the tenets of good science is transparency"; while Ronald Davis of Stanford University said: "the Lancet should step up to the plate and pull that paper". Horton defended The Lancet'''s publication of the trial and called the critics: "a fairly small, but highly organized, very vocal and very damaging group of individuals who have, I would say, actually hijacked this agenda and distorted the debate so that it actually harms the overwhelming majority of patients."

Starting in 2011, critics of the studies filed Freedom of Information Act requests to get access to the authors' primary data, in order to learn what the trial's results would have been under the original protocol. In 2016, some of the data was released, which allowed calculation of results based on the original protocol and found that additional treatment led to no significant improvement in recovery rates over the control condition.

 Metastudy on the use of hydroxychloroquine and chloroquine (2020) 
In May 2020, The Lancet published a metastudy by Mandeep R. Mehra of the Harvard Medical School and Dr. Sapan S. Desai of Surgisphere Corporation, which concluded that the malaria drugs hydroxychloroquine and chloroquine did not improve the condition of COVID-19 patients, and may have harmed some of them.

In response to concerns raised by members of the scientific community and the media about the veracity of the data and analyses,The Lancet decided to launch an independent third party investigation of Surgisphere and the metastudy. Specifically, The Lancet editors wanted to "evaluate the origination of the database elements, to confirm the completeness of the database, and to replicate the analyses presented in the paper." The independent peer reviewers in charge of the investigation notified The Lancet that Surgisphere would not provide the requested data and documentation. The authors of the metastudy then asked The Lancet'' to retract the article, which was done on June 3, 2020.

As a step to increase quality control, the editors of The Lancet Group announced changes to the editorial policy in a comment titled "Learning from a retraction" which was published on September 22, 2020.

Covid Commission head pushed US lab origin conspiracy theory (2022) 
In September 2022 the Lancet published the report of their "Covid-19 Commission" which was headed by Jeffery Sachs, who has pushed the conspiracy theory that Covid came from a US "biotechnology" lab 

Before the report's release he appeared on the podcast of Robert F. Kennedy Jr, who has "spread conspiracy theories about vaccines" and on the podcast Sach claimed that "Government officials such as Anthony S. Fauci “are not being honest” about the virus’s origins" 
Sachs also compared vaccine mandates to the Holocaust
The report included claims that "“independent researchers have not yet investigated” US labs, and said the National Institutes of Health has “resisted disclosing details” of its work."

Virologist Angela Rasmussen commented that this may have been "one of The Lancet's most shameful moments regarding its role as a steward and leader in communicating crucial findings about science and medicine".
Prof David Robertson from the University of Glasgow’s Centre for Virus Research said that “It’s really disappointing to see such a potentially influential report contributing to further misinformation on such an important topic.”

“It’s true we’ve details to understand on the side of natural origins, for example the exact intermediate species involved, but that doesn’t mean there’s… any basis to the wild speculation that US labs were involved,”

List of editors 
The following persons have been editors-in-chief of the journal:

See also 
 List of medical journals
 List of healthcare journals

References

External links 
 

1823 establishments in England
Academic journal series
Elsevier academic journals
English-language journals
General medical journals
Publications established in 1823
Weekly journals